Kampong Keriam is a village in Tutong District, Brunei, about  from the district town Pekan Tutong. The population was 2,195 in 2016. It is one of the villages within Mukim Keriam, a mukim in the district.

Background 
The village is claimed to be established by a certain Dusun man named  who migrated with his family in the old days from the present-day Kampong Sungai Bera in Belait District.

Geography 
The village neighbours Kampong Bukit Panggal to the north-east, Kampong Luagan Dudok to the east, Kampong Panchor Papan to the south-west, and Kampong Tanah Burok and Kampong Penanjong to the north-west. It is one of the settlements along Jalan Tutong, a primary road which connects the district town Pekan Tutong to the capital Bandar Seri Begawan.

Facilities 
Access to the village is through Jalan Tutong via Kampong Luagan Dudok from the east and Kampong Panchor Papan from the west.

Keriam Primary School is the village primary school and it was established in 1938. It also shares grounds with Keriam Religious School, the village school for the primary level of the country's Islamic religious education.

Kampong Keriam Mosque is the village mosque; it was completed in 1991 and can accommodate 300 worshippers.

References 

Keriam